Rhiza Ann Cenon Simbulan (born December 21, 1987), known professionally as Ryza Cenon, is a Filipino actress, dancer, model and painter.
In 2004, she became the Ultimate Female Survivor of the second season of StarStruck of GMA Network. She appeared in several shows including Darna, Ay, Robot!, Majika, Fantastikids, Fantastic Man, Joaquin Bordado, Buena Familia, and Alyas Robin Hood.

In the year 2016, Cenon starred as Jewel in the romantic gore indie film Ang Manananggal sa Unit 23B. In December 2016, she appeared as Georgia Acuzar-Ferrer in the TV show Ika-6 na Utos and became more popular because of that.

Ryza Cenon has been tagged as "Primera Kontrabida of the Philippines" since 2017.

Early life and education
Ryza Cenon was born Rhiza Ann Cenon Simbulan on December 21, 1987, in Gapan, a 4th class city in the province of Nueva Ecija, Philippines. She was the youngest child of the two children. Her mother, Rosanna C. Simbulan, died of stomach cancer in 1991 when Cenon was only three years old. Her father works as an OFW in Abu Dhabi, UAE.

Cenon lived with her maternal grandmother for most of her childhood. Right after Rosanna's death, Rhiza and her grandmother stayed in Gapan. They transferred to the province of Laguna a few years later. After her father's marriage to his second wife, Cenon transferred to Malabon City. She later transferred to Santa Rosa, Nueva Ecija after her father and step mother's separation. Few years later she left the province and transferred to her grandmother's residence in Santa Rosa, Laguna.

Cenon finished her elementary and high school at the Augustinian School of Cabuyao in Laguna. She later enrolled at the AMA Computer Learning Center and graduated as a computer programmer.

Career

Acting career

2004: Winning Star-Struck
In 2004, Cenon joined GMA Network's original reality talent search. She became the  Ultimate Female Survivor of StarStruck Season 2 (with Mike Tan as the  Ultimate Male Survivor). They both received 1,000,000 pesos plus exclusive contracts from the GMA Network. After winning StarStruck, Cenon appeared as a guest performer on the musical variety show SOP Gigsters (2004 - 2006).

2005–2010: Career beginnings
Cenon began her career with GMA Network playing the role of Mae in Now and Forever (2005). In the same year, she joined the cast of Darna. Cenon played the villainous Louella, a member of the Divas Impaktitas who was determined to exact vengeance upon Darna (played by Angel Locsin) after she what she did to her sister. Darna became the first primetime television series in the Philippines to earn a 47.1% rating in its pilot episode, the highest rating for a pilot episode in the Philippine television history.

In 2006, Cenon appeared in Majika with Angel Locsin, Dennis Trillo, and Katrina Halili. It is directed by Eric Quizon (who also directed Darna) and Mac Alejandre. Cenon played the anti-heroine role of Pria / Sara, Sabina's (played by Angel Locsin) younger sister. After Majika, she starred in the movie Lovestruck (2006) where she won the New Movie Actress of the Year at the 2006 Star Awards for Movies. In the same year she also played Anabelle on the fantasy-adventure series, Fantastikids, where she starred alongside Marky Cielo, Jackie Rice and Glaiza de Castro, as well as former child star Paolo Contis and former beauty queen Melanie Marquez.

In 2008, Cenon starred in the drama action series Joaquin Bordado alongside Robin Padilla, Iza Calzado, and Mark Herras. The series is based from a comic book serial by Carlo J. Caparas with the same title. Cenon played the role of Cecile, the granddaughter of General Russo (played by Eddie Garcia) and sister of Kevin (played by Antonio Aquitania) but spitefully angry at the person who caused her blindness. Actresses Jennylyn Mercado and Cristine Reyes were initially tapped to play important roles in the series. Due to Mercado's pregnancy, she had to be replaced by Cenon, while Reyes had some problems with the production and was quickly replaced by Iwa Moto.

Cenon played a number of supporting roles from 2007 to 2010, Cenon played the superheroine Wena / Fantastic Girl in Fantastic Man (2007) alongside Mark Herras and Jackie Rice, the estranged & cold-blooded Abril Del Castillo in Rosalinda (2009), the jealous and selfish Apple Madrigal in Gumapang Ka Sa Lusak (2010), the gold digger Candy / Joy Flores in Langit sa Piling Mo (2010), the happy and lighthearted Darlene Roces in Koreana (2010); and the villain Regine in Bantatay (2010).

2011–2016: Notable roles
In 2011, Cenon appeared as Mia Valencia in I Heart You, Pare! and her second project on GMA for 2011 was in another villain role in Machete which debuted on GMA Network on January 24, 2011, and ended on March 19 of that year. The show, which also starred Aljur Abrenica, Bela Padilla, Kris Bernal and the director actress Gina Alajar and is partly based on the 1990s Machete. Cenon played the ambitious Marla Lucero / Fake Aginaya / New Bugana and soon-to-be a villainess to dancer-actress Bela Padilla's heroine Aginaya/Rosella.

The following year, she appeared in the drama series Legacy. Cenon played the supporting role of Juliet, the super ambitious best friend of Diana Calcetas (played by Heart Evangelista). Right after Legacy, she played another villain role on Luna Blanca: Ang Ikalawang Yugto (Book 2). Cenon played Ashley Alvarez, one of the main villainess of the series second chapter and the younger sister of Divine Alvarez-Buenaluz (played by Chynna Ortaleza and later Carmi Martin).

Cenon appeared on three television series in 2013. The first drama series is Sana Ay Ikaw Na Nga where she played the female villain Olga Villavicer / Sandra Sebastian, the psychopathic and cold-hearted murderess. The second series, Indio, was an epic fantasy series directed by Dondon Santos. She also played the role of Isabel Alonso,  the supportive younger sister of the noble man Mariano Alfonso (played by Carlos Morales) but very arrogant and highly malevolent. The third series was Adarna where she played the role of Mikay.

In 2015, Cenon appeared as a supporting actress in three drama series on GMA Network: Mariel in Second Chances (2015), the supportive cunning sister Margarita "Rita" Barcial in Kailan Ba Tama ang Mali? (2015); and the supportive partner in crime Vaness Castro in Buena Familia (2015).

Cenon's acting career blossomed in the year 2016. She with actor Martin del Rosario starred in Ang Manananggal sa Unit 23B. This romantic gore independent film was directed by Prime Cruz and produced under The IdeaFirst Company. Cenon plays Jewel, the lonely manananggal who fell in love with the heartbroken man named Nico (played by Martin del Rosario). Sex and masturbation scenes were shot during the filming (one with actor Cholo Barretto). Her portrayal of Jewel is considered as her first mature role.

In December 2016, Cenon together with fellow actors Sunshine Dizon, Gabby Concepcion, and Mike Tan starred in the afternoon primetime series Ika-6 na Utos. Ryza plays the main villain role of Georgia Ferrer / Athena Francisco, the glamorous and evil mistress of Airline Captain Jerome "Rome" Fuentabella (played by Gabby Concepcion). Her character is described as a ruthless, psychopathic, cunning and seductive femme fatale. Cenon was nominated for Best Supporting Actress in the 2017 7th EdukCircle Awards for her performance in Ika 6 na Utos. On December 8, 2017, Cenon won her first Best Supporting Actress award in the 7th OFW Gawad Parangal. She received her TV Supporting Actress of the Year in the 49th Box-Office Entertainment Awards on May 1, 2018.

Cenon also appeared as the hotel attendant Georgia in the fantasy-comedy film Enteng Kabisote 10 and the Abangers (2016).

2017: Contract with Viva Artist Agency
On June 15, 2017, after thirteen years of being a talent of GMA Artist Center under GMA Network, Cenon signed an exclusive contract with Viva Artist Agency. In 2017, Cenon starred with JC Santos in Mr. and Mrs. Cruz. The movie was released on January 24, 2018. Cenon received the Yakushi Pearl Award at Osaka Asian Film Festival 2018 for her performance in Mr. and Mrs. Cruz.

2018: Transfer to ABS-CBN
On April 12, 2018, Cenon signed an exclusive contract with ABS-CBN. Her first project was FPJ's Ang Probinsyano. She played the role of Aubrey Hidalgo, the daughter of President Oscar Hidalgo (played by Rowell Santiago) and First Lady Marissa Hidalgo (played by Dawn Zulueta). She also appeared as one of the lead cast in The General's Daughter alongside Angel Locsin, Eula Valdez, Maricel Soriano, Janice de Belen, Albert Martinez and Tirso Cruz III.

Modeling career
Cenon appeared on several covers of FHM Philippines Magazine and was included on the list of the magazine's 100 Sexiest Women in the World. Cenon was ranked number 45 in 2005, number 68 in 2006, number 50 in 2007, number 58 in 2008, number 91 in 2009, number 95 in 2010, number 95 in 2011, number 15 in 2013, number 26 in 2014, number 22 in 2015, number 75 in 2016, and number 45 in 2017. She succeeded Sunshine Cruz as the FHM Philippines Cover Girl in May 2013.

SH3 trio
Cenon, together with LJ Reyes and Chynna Ortaleza, formed a sing-and-dance group called SH3 in January 2010. The trio performed on the Sunday variety show SOP Rules. The group disbanded in the same year.

Personal life
Cenon had an estranged relationship with her father and brother.

In an interview in 2017, she said that she suffered depression and attempted to commit suicide. She took up painting as an instrument to beat her depression. Independencia: Ang Panimula, Cenon's first painting exhibit, was held in a restaurant in San Juan City on June 19, 2016. Most of her paintings were abstract.

Aside from painting, Cenon is an enthusiast of archery. She is also into cooking. In 2015, she enrolled at the Center for Culinary Arts, Manila after the successful opening of her food business, PaBurrito.

She had a relationship with actor and model Cholo Barretto, cousin of fellow actor Julia Barretto. The relationship was confirmed by Cenon on November 23, 2016. The two broke up in January 2019, and in November of the same year, Cenon announced her "engagement" to herself.

In July 2020, Cenon announced on her Instagram that she was five months pregnant with her boyfriend and photographer Miguel Antonio Cruz. On October 31, 2020, Cenon and Cruz welcomed a healthy baby boy and named him Night.

Filmography

Television Drama Series

Drama Anthology

Comedy, Others, Variety, and Reality Shows

Movies

Awards, nominations and recognition

FHM Philippines rankings

References

External links

Ryza Cenon on iGMA.tv
Ryza Cenon on Instagram

1987 births
Filipino child actresses
Filipino female models
Filipino film actresses
Filipino television actresses
GMA Network personalities
ABS-CBN personalities
Star Magic
Viva Artists Agency
Living people
People from Northern Samar
StarStruck (Philippine TV series) participants
StarStruck (Philippine TV series) winners